Gundi Ellert (born 8 September 1951 in Lengenfeld, East Germany) is a German television actress.

Selected filmography
 Sleeper (2005)
 Löwengrube – Die Grandauers und ihre Zeit (1989, 2 episodes)

External links
 
 Agency Drews 

1951 births
Living people
People from Lengenfeld
German television actresses
20th-century German actresses
21st-century German actresses